Mammillaria sphaerica, the longmamma nipple cactus or pale mammillaria is a species of flowering plant in the cactus family Cactaceae, native to south eastern Texas in the USA and north eastern Mexico, where it occurs in scattered patches at altitudes up to .

Its status is listed as “Least Concern” by the IUCN Red List.

As it also requires dry conditions during winter, it is best grown under glass in temperate zones, in a typical free-draining, low nutrient cactus compost, in full sun. This plant has won the Royal Horticultural Society’s Award of Garden Merit.

References

Flora of Mexico
Flora of Texas
sphaerica